Prionopaltis is a genus of moths of the family Crambidae described by William Warren in 1892.

Species
Prionopaltis consocia Warren, 1892
Prionopaltis sericea Warren, 1892
Prionopaltis subdentalis Swinhoe, 1894

References

Spilomelinae
Crambidae genera
Taxa named by William Warren (entomologist)